The 2020–21 Clemson Tigers men's basketball team represented Clemson University during the 2020–21 NCAA Division I men's basketball season. The Tigers were led by eleventh-year head coach Brad Brownell and played their home games at Littlejohn Coliseum in Clemson, South Carolina as members of the Atlantic Coast Conference.

The Tigers finished the season 16–8, and 10–6 in ACC play to finish in a tie for fifth place.  As the fifth seed in the ACC tournament they earned a bye into the Second Round where they lost to Miami.  They earned an at-large bid to the NCAA tournament as a seven seed in the Midwest Region.  They lost in the first round to 10 seed Rutgers.

Previous season
The Tigers finished the 2019–20 season 16–15, 9–11 in ACC play to finish in eighth place. The team was scheduled to play Florida State in the quarterfinals of the ACC tournament before the tournament was cancelled due to the COVID-19 pandemic.  The NCAA tournament and NIT were also cancelled due to the pandemic.

Offseason

Departures

2020 recruiting class

Roster

Schedule and results
Source:

|-
!colspan=9 style=| Regular season

|-
!colspan=12 style=|ACC tournament

|-
!colspan=9 style=|NCAA tournament

Rankings

*AP does not release post-NCAA tournament rankings^Coaches did not release a Week 2 poll.

See also
2020–21 Clemson Tigers women's basketball team

References

Clemson Tigers men's basketball seasons
Clemson
Clemson
Clemson
Clemson